Astrophile, starring Davika Hoorne, Vachirawit Chivaaree and Jumpol Adulkittiporn, is a light hearted romantic Thai series about a simple girl who has met a boy, from her university, after a long time; however, she fails to recognise him immediately. Based on an original story selected through competition, the series is produced by GMMTV and directed by Koo Ekkasit Trakulkasemsuk. It was announced by GMMTV during the "BORDERLESS" event on 1 December 2021. The series officially premiered on 1 June 2022 on GMM 25.

Plot 
Nubdao (Davikah), an influencer and a host for a home shopping program, crosses paths with Kimhan (Bright). He instantly remembers her, however she fails to recognise him. Kim maintains secrecy in order to get closer to her. Kim, due to some family circumstances, moves to his friend Pete's place, which is around Nub's area. At work, Tankhun (Off), Nub's friend and a producer of the show, harbours secret feelings for her. During one of the live shows, Nub faces inappropriate actions from her boss Minjun (Foei). Tan and Jaikaew (Jenny) try to protect her. This goes viral and the audience takes Nub's behaviour differently. In this situation, Nub receives advice from an unknown follower through messages on her Instagram. Kim and his assistant Poi (First) manage to get a creative project, which turns out to be in Nub's show. Kim and Nub start to get closer due to their frequent encounters, and Tan begins to get jealous.

Meena, Kim's ex-lover, gets abused by her partner, so she returns to Kim for support, which makes Nub uneasy. A new coworker Kewalin (Kapook) gets hired, but she makes things unpleasant for Nub, blaming her for bullying and for financial mismanagement. Amidst all, Kim is hiding one more secret from Nub - that he is a painter. Without Kim's knowledge, Pete pretends to be this painter in front of Nub's friend Nammon and she falls for him. When the truth comes to light, the situation gets complex. How Kim reveals his identity to Nub and they sort things between them is the main plot.

Cast

Soundtracks 
Opening title "Counting Stars" is sung by Fluke Gawin launched on 31 May 2022 on GMMTV Records. The lyrics are in Thai and English, composed by Kasidej Hongladaromp & James Alyn Wee.

International broadcast 
Astrophile can be watched on TRUEID, and it is available on streaming platform VIU in Thailand, Indonesia, Malaysia, Singapore, Hong Kong, and Myanmar.  It is broadcast on Japanese television station TV Asahi CS TeleAsa Channel 1. Owing to increasing popularity Astrophile got featured on Vidio equipped with Indonesian subtitles.

Production 
Davikah wanted to work with Bright, hence her manager contacted GMMTV. Once the deal was finalised, GMMTV organised a contest for a fresh original story and the winner's story is made into Astrophile. The shooting of the series started in 2022, after its initial announcement in December 2021. Episode 1 was released on 1 July 2022.

Viewership ratings 
Astrophile was trending at rank 1 in Thailand and worldwide rank 3 on Twitter. Both local and international viewers accepted this light hearted story. After an initial slow pick-up, through positive word of mouth the series started trending in Malaysia, Mynamar, Mexico, Indonesia, Vietnam, and the Philippines. The chemistry of Bright with Davikah is much appreciated. By January 2023, Astrophile series had over  views on its official GMMTV YouTube channel and the pilot episode had over 5M views.

Average TV viewership ratings 
 The  number represents the lowest ratings and the  number represents the highest ratings.

Based on the average audience share per episode.

Awards and nominations 
'Astrophile' won the best outstanding plot (the winner) from GMM25 contest in 2022. Plot writer is @/duangmaan.

References

External links 
 Astrophile at GMMTV official website
 Official Trailer
 

Thai romance television series
Television series by GMMTV